Karine Boucher (born 28 July 1972) is a French artistic gymnast, born in  Orléans. She competed at the 1988 Summer Olympics, and the 1992 Summer Olympics.

References

External links

1972 births
Living people
Sportspeople from Orléans
French female artistic gymnasts
Olympic gymnasts of France
Gymnasts at the 1988 Summer Olympics
Gymnasts at the 1992 Summer Olympics
20th-century French women